The 2010 Italian motorcycle Grand Prix was the fourth round of the 2010 Grand Prix motorcycle racing season. It took place on the weekend of 4–6 June 2010 at the Mugello Circuit. Seven-time MotoGP world champion Valentino Rossi suffered a displaced compound fracture of his right tibia in free practice, after losing control of his Yamaha in one of the circuit's fast corners. The injury saw him lose any hope of retaining his 2008 and 2009 crowns.

Dani Pedrosa dominated the MotoGP event aboard his Honda, reaching the finish line well clear of chasing championship leader Jorge Lorenzo in second. Andrea Dovizioso took third, while ex-champion Casey Stoner took his Ducati to fourth on the final lap. The 125cc race saw the first victory of future multiple MotoGP world champion Marc Márquez.

MotoGP classification

Moto2 classification

125 cc classification

Championship standings after the race (MotoGP)
Below are the standings for the top five riders and constructors after round four has concluded.

Riders' Championship standings

Constructors' Championship standings

 Only the top five positions are included for both sets of standings.

References

Italian motorcycle Grand Prix
Italian
Motorcycle Grand Prix
June 2010 sports events in Italy